Totela is a poorly described Bantu language of Zambia. Its classification is assumed rather than demonstrated.

Maho (2009) classifies the nearby Totela of Namibia as a distinct but closely related language.

References

External links
Completion and Dissociation in Totela Tense and Aspect (PDF)

Subia languages